Kamayevo (Qamay) is a rural locality (a selo) in Urmanayevsky Selsoviet, Bakalinsky District, Bashkortostan, Russia. The population was 136 as of 2010.

Geography 
It is located 47 km from Bakaly and 8 km from Urmanayevo.

References 

Rural localities in Bakalinsky District